Tell Nasri, also known as Walto ), is a village near Tell Tamer in western al-Hasakah Governorate, northeastern Syria. Administratively it belongs to the Nahiya Tell Tamer.

The village is inhabited by Assyrians belonging to the Assyrian Church of the East. At the 2004 census, it had a population of 650.

In recent years, during the Syrian Civil War, the Assyrian Church of St. Mary had been destroyed by ISIS in April 2015. Before that, on 23rd February 2015, Tell Nasri had been attacked by ISIS and its people fled to both Al-Hasaka and Qamishli seeking refuge.

See also

Assyrians in Syria
List of Assyrian settlements
Al-Hasakah offensive (February–March 2015)

References

Assyrian communities in Syria